The electoral district of Cumberland was a single-member electoral district of the Tasmanian House of Assembly. It was based in central Tasmania in towns such as Bothwell, Hamilton and Ouse, and until 1894 included much of the West Coast before the mining districts of Zeehan and Queenstown became large enough to require their own seats.

The seat was created ahead of the Assembly's first election held in 1856, and was abolished when the Tasmanian parliament adopted the Hare-Clark electoral model in 1909. Some controversy existed over the 1893 election result, as a redistribution still awaiting royal assent had not been carried out due to the snap election and the sitting member and Speaker of the House, Nicholas John Brown, lost the seat to Don Urquhart, a Zeehan solicitor. The Supreme Court ultimately resolved the matter in Brown's favour, and a new seat, Montagu, was created which Urquhart stood for and won.

Members for Cumberland

References
 
 
 Parliament of Tasmania (2006). The Parliament of Tasmania from 1956

Cumberland